Wizards of Waverly Place is the soundtrack album from the Disney Channel Original Series of the same name. The album was released as a physical CD, enhanced CD and digital on August 4, 2009, under Walt Disney Records. The album includes songs from and inspired by the television series and Wizards of Waverly Place: The Movie.

Background
In an interview with Disney Channel's commercial-segment, Disney 365, Selena Gomez discussed her interpretations of the songs on the soundtrack saying: "Disappear is more of a romantic song. It's basically talking about how a girl likes a guy and they [she] don't want him to disappear, and then Magical is about casting a spell on a guy and this song, Magic, ties into Wizards of Waverly Place: The Movie". Although recorded for the episode of the same name, "Make It Happen" does not appear on the album.

Critical reception

In response to the soundtrack, Stephen Thomas Erlewine of AllMusic recognized Wizards for its "teen revamps of boomer classics that parents can enjoy too". He also stated that the album is "agreeable" and that Selena Gomez "inevitably stands out from the pack". However, Erlewine said: "the dang-awful version of America's "You Can Do Magic" by Drew Seeley is sunk by its hyper-claustrophobic rhythms, the biggest rearrangement of a tune here and easily the worst cut."

Singles
"Magic" by Selena Gomez is a digital single on the iTunes Store. The song was released on July 21, 2009 as part of the Radio Disney iTunes Pass. "Magic" premiered on Radio Disney and a music video to Disney Channel on July 24. The song's music video has Gomez singing into a microphone with bright and flamboyant background, as well as including clips from Wizards of Waverly Place: The Movie. "Magic" debuted at no. 61 in the Billboard Hot 100 with 42,000 downloads.

Billie Eilish and her record-producer brother, Finneas, acknowledged a connection between her single "Bad Guy" and Gomez's version of "Everything Is Not What It Seems" in a Rolling Stone interview in December 2019.

Track listing

Bonus content
Bonus content for the physical CD for Wizards of Waverly Place includes exclusive behind-the-scenes interviews with Gomez and also the new music video for "Magic".

Charts and sales
The album debuted at #24 on the Billboard 200, selling 18,000 units in its first week. It has sold 106,000 copies in the U.S. to date.

International release
The soundtrack was released in the UK on October 5, 2009, although not stocked up in most of the UK, and in Mexico released on August 14, 2009.

Personnel
Credits

John Adair - producer
Michael Bruno (member of Honor Society) - vocals, guitar
Kate Cabebe  (member of KSM) - drums
Katie Cecil  (member of KSM) - vocals, guitar
Shelby Cobra (member of KSM) - vocals
Ryan Elder - Producer
John Fields - Producer, engineer, mixing
Steve Gerdes - art direction
Matthew Gerrard - producer, mixing
Selena Gomez - vocals
Paul David Hager - mixing
Steve Hampton - producer
Daniel James - mixing
Andrew Lee (member of Honor Society) - vocals, keyboard, bass
Jon Lind - A&R
Brian Malouf - executive producer, mixing
Stephen Marcussen - mastering
Meaghan Martin - vocals
Dani Markman - A&R
William J. McAuley III - producer, engineer
Sophia Melon (member of KSM) - vocals, bass
Alyson Michalka - vocals
Amanda Michalka  - vocals
Mitchel Musso - vocals
Alexander Noyes (member of Honor Society) - drums
Shae Padilla (member of KSM) - guitar
Jason Pennock - mixing
Jason Rosen (member of Honor Society) - vocals, guitar, keyboard
Steve Rushton - vocals
Curt Schneider - producer
Drew Seeley - vocals
Raven-Symoné - vocals
Anabel Sinn - design
Louie Teran - mastering
Kent Verderico - mixing
Steve Vincent - music executive
Trey Vittetoe - producer

References

External links
Wizards of Waverly Place on Walt Disney Records

Children's music albums
Television soundtracks
Wizards of Waverly Place
2009 soundtrack albums
Pop soundtracks
Walt Disney Records soundtracks